Ji-hwan, also spelled Chi-hwan, is a Korean masculine given name. The meaning differs based on the hanja used to write each syllable of the name. There are 46 hanja with the reading "ji" and 21 hanja with the reading "hwan" on the South Korean government's official list of hanja which may be used in given names.

People with this name include:
Ahn Ji-hwan (born 1969), South Korean voice actor, television/radio presenter, and actor 
Han Ji-hwan (born 1977), South Korean former judoka
Kang Ji-hwan (born 1977), South Korean actor
Han Chi-hwan (born 1984), South Korean civil rights activist
Oh Ji-hwan (born 1990), South Korean baseball shortstop (Korea Baseball Organization)
Bae Ji-hwan (born 1999), South Korean baseball shortstop (US Major League Baseball)

See also
List of Korean given names

References

Korean masculine given names